Calliopius is a genus of amphipods in the family Calliopiidae. There are about nine described species in Calliopius.

Species
These nine species belong to the genus Calliopius:
 Calliopius behringi Gurjanova, 1951
 Calliopius carinatus Bousfield & Hendrycks, 1997
 Calliopius columbianus Bousfield & Hendrycks, 1997
 Calliopius crenulatus Chevreux & Fage, 1925
 Calliopius georgianus Pfeffer
 Calliopius laeviusculus (Krøyer, 1838)
 Calliopius pacificus Bousfield & Hendrycks, 1997
 Calliopius rathkii Zaddach, 1844
 Calliopius sablensis Bousfield & Hendrycks, 1997

References

Further reading

External links

 

Amphipoda
Articles created by Qbugbot